Curtonotum helvum, the curtonotid fly, is a species of fly in the family Curtonotidae.

References

Ephydroidea
Articles created by Qbugbot
Insects described in 1862